Michelle Cailin Mack is an ecologist working on the connections between plants and climate in polar regions. She is a fellow of the Ecological Society of America and the American Geophysical Union. She currently holds the title of Regent's Professor at Northern Arizona University.

Education and career 
Mack has both a B.A. and a B.S. from Evergreen State College (1990) and went on to earn a Ph.D. from the University of California, Berkeley in 1998. Following her Ph.D. she worked at the University of Alaska Fairbanks until 2002, first as a postdoc working with F. Stuart Chapin III and then as a research associate in the Institute of Arctic Biology. In 2002 she moved to the University of Florida where she was promoted to professor in 2013. In 2014 she moved to Northern Arizona University.

Research 
Mack's research investigations include examining how human activity and the introduction of non-native species impacts terrestrial ecosystems. For example, she has examined how changes in C4 grasses have changed nitrogen cycling in Hawaii Volcanoes National Park, and how changes in nutrients change the storage of carbon and bacterial communities in polar regions. Her research includes investigations of the role of fire, thermokarst lakes, and permafrost thawing on carbon cycling in polar regions.

Selected publications

Awards and honors 

 Kavli Frontiers of Science Fellow, National Academy of Science (2008)
 Fellow, Ecological Society of America (2016)
 Fellow, American Geophysical Union (2021)

References

External links 

 

Fellows of the American Geophysical Union
Fellows of the Ecological Society of America
Living people
Evergreen State College alumni
University of California, Berkeley alumni
Northern Arizona University faculty
Women ecologists
Carbon scientists
Year of birth missing (living people)